Granulifusus noguchii is a species of sea snail, a marine gastropod mollusk in the family Fasciolariidae, the spindle snails, the tulip snails and their allies.

Description

Distribution

References

 Hadorn R. & Fraussen K. 2005. Revision of the genus Granulifusus Kuroda & Habe 1954 with description of some new species (Gastropoda: Prosobranchia: Fasciolariidae). Archiv für Molluskenkunde 134 (2): 129–171.

Fasciolariidae
Gastropods described in 1990